Scott G. Sunderland (born 28 November 1966) is an Australian former professional cyclist, who is a now a sports manager and consultant.

Sunderland was born in Inverell, a country town in northern New South Wales. He worked double shifts in the Inverell abattoirs to fund his early European racing career.

Until he retired at the end of 2004, Sunderland was Australia's longest serving professional cyclist, and placed highly in many of the cycling world's greatest events.

As a racer, Sunderland had some injuries and setbacks, the most memorable being when he was struck by a car driven by his former director, Cees Priem, during the 1998 Amstel Gold race.

Sunderland recovered and the final few years of his career saw a resurgent Scott Sunderland.

Sunderland rode his last Tour de France in 2004.

Management career
After his retirement Scott Sunderland became Sports Director with Bjarne Riis' CSC squad from 2004 till end of 2008. He coached the team to consecutive wins in the Paris–Roubaix in 2006 and 2007. In 2008 CSC squad took the overall victory in the Tour de France with Spanish star rider Carlos Sastre.

In September 2008, Sunderland was recruited by the Cervélo TestTeam owner Gerard Vroomen to form his newly announced Professional Cycling Team. 2008 Tour de France winner Carlos Sastre followed Sunderland in his move.

Early 2009 Sunderland was headhunted by British Cycling and BC High Performance Manager Dave Brailsford and appointed Sports Manager to help put together a new professional British road cycling team, financially backed by BSkyB.
 
In 2010, Team Sky entered its first year of competition with Scott Sunderland in the position of Senior Sports Director.

In February 2010 the team got its first semi-classic victory when Juan Antonio Flecha won the Belgian semi-classic Omloop Het Nieuwsblad with a solo break. 
 Sunderland left Team Sky in May 2010, citing that he wanted to spend more time with his family.

Sunderland took up a role as a Race Director for the National Road Series, Australia's premier domestic road cycling competition, in 2013

In 2019 Sunderland took on the role of general race director of the Flanders Classics in Belgium.

Major results

Juniors Under 16
 NSW State Champion (Road Race)
 2nd Teams Pursuit (Track) Australian National Championships
 2nd Teams Time-trial (Road) Australian National Championships
Juniors Under 18
 NSW State Champion (Individual National Road Race)
 Australian National Champion 50 km Teams Time-trial (Road)
 Australian National Champion Teams Pursuit (Track)
Oceania Games
 1st Individual Road Race, 1st Time Trial, 2nd teams pursuit (Track), 3rd 30 km point score (Track)
1985 Amateur
 NSW State Champion, 50 km point score (Track)
 2nd 4000m teams pursuit (Track) Australian National Championships
1986 Amateur
 1st  Australian Individual Senior National Road Championships (Aged 19 - racing elite)
1990
 Out due to a knee injury in the early part of the season
 14th Paris–Camembert
 Finished Tour of Switzerland and Giro d'Italia
1991
 1st Trofeo Pantalica
 9th Overall Tirreno–Adriatico
 3rd in stage 4
 4th Overall Herald Sun Tour
 7th Overall Kellogg's Tour of Great Britain
1992
 1st Overall Mazda Alpine Tour
 1st Mountain jersey,

 5th Milan–San Remo

 4th Overall Settimana Ciclista Internazionale
 3rd stage 12 Vuelta a España
1993
Winner Oppy Oscar Cyclist of the Year, Australia

 3rd Zottegem
 4th Stage 3 Vuelta a España
 5th Stage 2 Vuelta a España
 10th Overall Tour of Switzerland,
 13th Milan–San Remo
1994
 1st Schynberg Rundfahrt Sulz
 2nd Trophee Des Grimpeurs
 4th stage 1 Vuelta de Pays Basque
 10th Overall Kelloggs Tour of Great Britain,
 1st Mountains jersey
 10th Overall Vuelta a Burgos
 15th Clásica de San Sebastián
 17th World Championships Sicily
1995
Knee operation in April; back in competition in July

10th Giro Del Emilia
11th Coppa Sabatini
13th Coppa Placci
1996
 1st Stage 4 Tour Des Regions Wallonne
 16th Overall Tour of Luxemburg
3rd in 1 stage
1997
 1st Sprint classification Tour De Romandie
 7th Overall Tour Du Mediterrian
 10th Milan-Turin
 14th Paris - Bourges
 15th Tour of Lombardie
 19th Overall Paris–Nice
5th in stage over Mt Ventoux
 19th Overall Vuelta Du Pays Basque
2nd in stage 3
1998
 1st GP Nokere
 3rd G.P. Pino Cerami
 6th Kemzeke
 9th G.P. Cholet
 11th Tour of Flanders
 11th Gent–Wevelgem

Out of competition from May 1998 until 18 July 1999 due to accident during Amstel Gold World Cup Race

1999
A crash kept him out of competition until July 1999

 1st Stage 1 Vuelta a Castilla-Leon
 4th Overall Commonwealth Bank Classic,
 1st King of the Mountains Classification
 1st Points Classification
2000
 1st Noosa Criterium
 2nd stage 4 Vuelta a Burgos
 3rd stage 2 Vuelta a Burgos,
 2nd Australian National Road Race Championships
 3rd Overijse
 4th Zottegem
 7th World Road Race Championships
2001
 1st Grand Prix Pino Cerami
 1st Grand Prix Fourmies
 1st Stage 5 Herald Sun Tour
 2nd Brabantse Pijl
 2nd Grand Prix Rennes
 3rd Paris–Camembert
 3rd Grand Prix Wallonie
 3rd Overall Paris–Corrèze
 3rd Paris–Bourges
 5th Overall Hessen Rundfahrt
 1st in Mountains Classification
 13th Overall Tour of Germany
 18th Amstel Gold Race
2002
 1st Stage 7 Bank Austria Tour
2003
 2nd CSC Classic
 23rd Overall Giro d'Italia
2004
 44th Paris–Roubaix
 96th Overall Tour de France

References

External links
 http://www.scottsunderland.com/
 https://www.twitter.com/triplesmc
 http://www.velonation.com/News/ID/2170/Sunderland-talks-High-Performance-as-UCI-initiates-new-cycling-era.aspx
 http://www.cyclingnews.com/news/sky-to-nurture-young-talent

1966 births
Living people
Australian male cyclists
Australian cycling coaches
Cyclists from New South Wales
People from Inverell